Ahmad Mehranfar (born May 31, 1975) is an Iranian actor. He is best known for his role as Arastou Amel in Capital (2011–2021).

Filmography

Film

Web

Television

Awards and nominations

References

External links

 
 
Ahmad Mehranfar Sitent website
Young Ahmad Mehranfar today

1975 births
Living people
People from Kashan
Iranian male film actors
Iranian male stage actors
University of Tehran alumni
Iranian male television actors